Johannes Theodorus 'Sakkie' Sauermann  (16 November 1944 – 13 June 2014) was a South African rugby union player.

Biography

Sauermann played five test matches and six tour matches for the Springboks. His debut was in 1972 against . He played two test matches against France and one each against,  and the British Lions.

Test history

See also
List of South Africa national rugby union players – Springbok no. 449

References

1944 births
2014 deaths
South African rugby union players
South Africa international rugby union players
Golden Lions players
People from Alberton, Gauteng
Rugby union players from Gauteng
Rugby union props